Hovhannes Imastaser (c. 1047–1129), also known as Hovhannes Sarkavag, was a medieval Armenian multi-disciplinary scholar known for his works on philosophy, theology, mathematics, cosmology, and literature. Imastaser was also a gifted hymnologist and pedagogue.

Biography 

Hovhannes Imastaser was born around 1047 in the district of Gardman (village of Pib) of historical Armenia’s eastern province of Utik, which today is located in Azerbaijan, north of Nagorno Karabakh.
The most extensive historical account of Hovhannes Imastaser’s life and work is in the 12-13th century Armenian historian Kirakos Gandzaketsi’s “History of Armenia.”  There also exists a 13th-century anonymous biography of Hovhannes Imastaser, which is attributed sometimes to Kirakos Gandzaketsi.

Hovhannes received his education in theology and science in Haghbat and Sanahin, two important monastic centers of Armenian medieval scholarship. Upon the completion of his studies, Hovhannes moved to medieval Armenia's capital city of Ani, where he taught philosophy, mathematics, music, cosmography and grammar. In Ani, Hovhannes received the ecclesiastical rank of sarkavag (deacon), and eventually rose to become a vardapet (archimandrite, Doctor of Theology) of the Armenian Apostolic Church. But it was the title sarkavag, however, that became attached to his name.

While Hovhannes Imastaser was recognized as a master of Armenian literature, his works acquired wider publicity only in the 19th century when they were published by Abbot Ghevont Alishan, a member of the Mekhitarist Congregation in Venice that is associated with Armenian Catholics. Imastaser's innovative approach to literature, for which he is often referred to as a key representative of Armenian literary renaissance, is fully demonstrated in his poem Ban Imastutian (Discourse on Wisdom). In the poem, written as a dialogue between the author and a blackbird, the bird symbolizes nature, which, per author, is the main inspiration behind art. In Imastaser's time, artistic inspiration was usually attributed to divine reasons.

As a hymnologist, Imastaser wrote several important sharakans (hymns): Tagh Harutean (Ode to the Resurrection), Paitsaratsan Aisor (Brightened on This Day), Anskizbn Bann Astvatz (God, The Infinite Word), Anchareli Bann Astavatz (God, The Inexpressible Word). The latter two are acrostic compositions, each encompassing within their ten stanzas thirty six letters of the Armenian Alphabet. In them, Imastaser glorifies heroes and martyrs who sacrificed their lives defending Armenian homeland and their Christian faith. Imastaser also introduced another patriotic theme to Armenian literature and music: emigration. In his hymns Imastaser prays to God so that Armenians who left their country could find strength to return home.

Hovhannes Imastaser also contributed to the standardization of the Armenian prayer book and Psalter.

Hovhannes Imastaser's work in mathematics is represented by the volume Haghaks Ankiunavor Tvots (Concerning Polygonal Numbers). This work indicates a profound knowledge of all important ancient and medieval mathematicians, including Pythagoras, Euclid and Aristotle. Hovhannes Imastaser translated into Armenian the works of the following classical scholars: Philo of Alexandria, Dionysius the Areopagite, Gregory of Nyssa, Porphyry, and, as mentioned, Aristotle and Euclid.

In 1084, Hovhannes Imastaser became involved in the project of developing so-called Minor Armenian Calendar, which included all 365 days plus one additional day. Eventually, his work on calendars led to the invention of a perpetual or eternal calendar.

One of the most important citations of Hovhannes Imastaser reflects his understanding of the role of the empirical method in science. 150 years before Roger Bacon, Hovhannes Imastaser famously noted: “Without experimentation, no opinion can be considered probable and acceptable; only experiment produces confirmation and certainty.”

References

Bibliography

External links 

Armenian musicologists
Armenian philosophers
Armenian mathematicians
12th-century Armenian writers
12th-century mathematicians
11th-century Armenian writers